The Davis DA-6 is a prototype V-tailed, low wing, four-place aircraft. The aircraft was based on the Davis DA-2 design with an extended "greenhouse" glass cabin.

Development
The prototype aircraft was built in Stanton, Texas and intended to be certified with a Lycoming O-320 engine. Even though the aircraft was based on a homebuilt design, it was intended to be eventually certified.

Design
The aircraft has a unique feature, a small 6" long airfoil under the V-tail used as a "flying trim tab".

Operational history
The prototype was displayed at both the EAA Convention and the Kerrville, Texas fly-in in 1981.

Specifications Davis DA-6

Notes

References

Davis aircraft
1980s United States sport aircraft
Single-engined tractor aircraft
Low-wing aircraft
V-tail aircraft
Aircraft first flown in 1981